Superimposed is an Indie Metal band based in Manchester, England. The exact membership of the band is subject to speculation, as the number of members appearing at gigs varies, and their identity is heavily masked. Through their record company, Hackwork Records they have stated that the band name is a take on the nature of pop music, which they view as being at odds with the culture of the UK.

History
Very little is known about the history of the band, and the website is vague with the details, specifying only that the current lineup was formed under the name Chad Redir in early 2000, as a Bavarian Darkwave act, although little corroborative evidence can be found for this. 

The name was changed in mid-2005, and the first track from their new album, An Unfortunate Turn for the Worse was made available for download on 1 December 2005. The remaining nine tracks off the album would go on commercial release, according to the website, on 15 March 2006. So far, the only available track from the album is "Caliphate of Cordoba".

Quotations 
"Listen to the music... It's beautiful. You, You are part of it... for as long as you last."—Unnamed band member, Bellhouse Club gig, 12 January 2006

Discography 
An Unfortunate Turn for the Worse (2005)

External links 
Hackwork Records

English heavy metal musical groups
Musical groups from Manchester